Polymenorrhagia, also known as frequent and heavy periods or frequent and heavy menstrual bleeding as well as epimenorrhagia or polyhypermenorrhea, is a menstrual disorder which refers to a combination of polymenorrhea (frequent menstrual bleeding) and menorrhagia (heavy menstrual bleeding).

References

Menstrual disorders